The HTTP Archive format, or HAR, is a JSON-formatted archive file format for logging of a web browser's interaction with a site.  The common extension for these files is .har.

The specification for the HTTP Archive (HAR) format defines an archival format for HTTP transactions that can be used by a web browser to export detailed performance data about web pages it loads.  The specification for this format is produced by the Web Performance Working Group of the World Wide Web Consortium (W3C). This document was never published by the W3C Web Performance Working Group and has been abandoned.

Support 
The HAR format is supported by various software, including:
 Charles Proxy
 Fiddler
 Firebug
 Firefox
 Google Chrome
 Internet Explorer 9
 Microsoft Edge
Postman
OWASP ZAP

References

External links 
 W3C HAR editor's draft
 What is HAR File And How To Generate HAR File
 

Archive formats
Hypertext Transfer Protocol